Aeroporto is a settlement in the northern part of Príncipe Island in São Tomé and Príncipe. Its population is 243 (2012 census). Aeroporto settlement lies directly east of the Príncipe Airport (hence the name) and north of the island capital Santo António.

Population history

References

Populated places in the Autonomous Region of Príncipe